Longcliffe Goods Yard was a goods station located on the Cromford and High Peak Railway in Longcliffe, Derbyshire. Mostly for moving mineral and quarry traffic. It closed in 1967 along with the rest of the line. And today, nothing remains of the goods yard. The trackbed now forms part of the High Peak Trail.

References

External links
The Railway Goods Shed and Warehouse in England

Disused railway stations in Derbyshire
Railway stations in Great Britain closed in 1967